Léon Bonnery (28 February 1894 – 11 January 1969) was a French racing cyclist. He rode in the 1921 Tour de France.

References

External links
 

1894 births
1969 deaths
French male cyclists
Place of birth missing